Kate McCabe, formerly a journalist, is the bestselling author of many fictional books, including The Beach Bar, Forever Friends, The Music of Love, and Magnolia Park. Her career as a writer started in 2005, when her first book, Hotel Les Flores, was published.

Bibliography
 Hotel Las Flores, Poolbeg Press, Dublin, 2005, 
 The Beach Bar, Poolbeg Press, Dublin, 2006, 
 The Book Club, Poolbeg Press, Dublin, 2007, 
 Forever Friends, Poolbeg Press, Dublin, 2008, 
 Casa Clara, Poolbeg Press, Dublin, 2010, 
 Magnolia Park, Poolbeg Press, Dublin, 2012, 
 The Man of Her Dreams, Hachette Books, Dublin, 2013, 
 The Spanish Letter, Hachette Books, Dublin, 2014, 
 The Music of Love, Hachette Books, Dublin, 2015, 
 The Love of Her Life, Hachette Books, Dublin, 2016,

References

Irish women journalists
Irish women novelists
Living people
21st-century Irish novelists
21st-century Irish women writers
Year of birth missing (living people)